The Worst Date Ever or How it Took a Comedy Writer to Expose Africa's Secret War is a memoir written by the British comedy writer Jane Bussmann. The book exposes the war crimes and corruption of the Lord's Resistance Army and the Ugandan government army using black humour and gonzo journalism.

Overview
After becoming frustrated with celebrity culture, Bussmann became inspired by the American peace activist and conflict resolution expert John Prendergast. Bussmann traveled to Uganda and began investigating the war crimes of Joseph Kony. Part investigative journalism, part dark comedy and part romantic satire, the story is couched in the author's unrequited attempt to get a date with Prendergast.

Reception
Reviewers consistently found the book to be truly funny, although some believed that her use of comedy in horrific situations was frequently inappropriate.

In The New York Times, Daniel Bergner reported that John Prendergast enjoyed introducing himself to a person he spotted reading the book.

References

External links

British comedy novels
2009 British novels
Novels set in Uganda
Macmillan Publishers books
Lord's Resistance Army